The Vorkuta Uprising was a major uprising of forced labor camp inmates at the Vorkuta Gulag in Vorkuta, Russian SFSR, USSR from 19 July (or 22 July) to 1 August 1953, shortly after the arrest of Lavrentiy Beria. The uprising was violently stopped by the camp administration after two weeks of bloodless standoff.

Background
Vorkuta Rechlag (River Camp) or Special Camp No. 6 consisted of 17 separate "departments" engaged in construction of coal mines, coal mining and forestry. In 1946 it housed 62,700 inmates, 56,000 in July 1953. A substantial portion of the camp guards were former convicts. According to Aleksandr Solzhenitsyn, the uprising was provoked by two unconnected events of June 1953: the arrest of Lavrentiy Beria in Moscow and the arrival of Ukrainian prisoners who, unlike long-term Russian inmates, were still missing their freedom (similar dissent existed between Baltic - the second largest group - and Polish inmates). Another major factor was the application of the March 1953 general amnesty, issued after the death of Joseph Stalin, to only convicts with criminal sentences and small prison terms, of which there were few in Vorkuta, as a large part of the inmates were political prisoners.

Uprising
The uprising—initially in the form of a passive walkout—began on or before July 19, 1953, at a single "department" and quickly spread to five others. Initial demands—to give inmates access to a state attorney and due justice—quickly changed to political demands. According to inmate Leonid Markizov, Voice of America and the BBC broadcast regular news about the events in Rechlag, with correct names, ranks and numbers. Even without foreign assistance, strikes at nearby sites were clearly visible as the wheels of the mine headframes stopped rotating, and word was spread by trains, which had slogans painted by prisoners on the sides, and whose crews spread news. The total number of inmates on strike reached 18,000. The inmates remained static within the barbed wire perimeters.

For a week following the initial strike the camp administration apparently did nothing; they increased perimeter guards but took no forceful action against inmates. The mines were visited by State Attorney of the USSR, Roman Rudenko, Internal Troops Commander, Ivan Maslennikov, and other top brass from Moscow. The generals spoke to the inmates who sat idle in camp courtyards, so far peacefully. However, on July 26 the mob stormed the maximum security punitive compound, releasing 77 of its inmates. The commissars from Moscow remained in Vorkuta, planning their response.

On July 31 camp chief Derevyanko started mass arrests of "saboteurs"; inmates responded with barricades. The next day, August 1, after further bloodless clashes between inmates and guards, Derevyanko ordered direct fire at the mob. According to Leonid Markizov, 42 were killed on the spot, 135 wounded (many of them, deprived of medical help, died later). According to Solzhenitsyn, there were 66 killed. Among those shot was the Latvian Catholic priest Jānis Mendriks.

After submission of the mob, many "saboteurs" were arrested and placed in maximum security cells, but without further punitive executions. Conditions were marginally improved (especially for "political" inmates).

In popular culture
A similar fictional uprising at Vorkuta, albeit in 1963 when the camp had already been shut down, was depicted in the story mode of the 2010 video game Call of Duty: Black Ops.

Literature 
 Rislakki, Jukka. Vorkuta! Gulag Uprising (Vorkuta! Vankileirin kapina ja sen suomalainen johtohahmo), WSOY, 2013.

See also
List of uprisings in the Gulag
Novocherkassk massacre
List of Gulag camps
John H. Noble

References

Sources
 Markizov, L. P. Uprising, not sabotage (Маркизов Л.П., Не "волынка" - восстание - "Дым Отечества", 1993)
 Aleksandr Solzhenitsyn, The Gulag Archipelago, v.3 ch. 11

1953 in the Soviet Union
Gulag uprisings
1953 riots
Mass murder in 1953
1953 protests
July 1953 events in Europe
August 1953 events in Europe